Rev. Joy Joseph Johnson (died December 30, 1996) was an African-American Baptist minister and politician from North Carolina. Johnson was the second African-American member of the North Carolina House of Representatives since the passage of the Voting Rights Act. Johnson followed Rep. Henry E. Frye and served from 1971 to 1979. He was the ninth pastor of the First Baptist Church in Fairmont, North Carolina. He represented Robeson County, North Carolina in the House of Representatives.

References

Year of birth missing
1996 deaths
African-American state legislators in North Carolina
People from Fairmont, North Carolina
African-American Baptist ministers
Baptists from North Carolina